Guraleus delicatulus is a species of sea snail, a marine gastropod mollusk in the family Mangeliidae.

Description
The length of the shell attains 9 mm.

The shell is subdiaphanous, shining ; pale yellow, slenderly and irregularly zoned with red lines.

Distribution
This marine species is endemic to Australia and can be found off South Australia, Tasmania and Victoria

References

 Tenison-Woods, J.E. (1879a) On some new species of Tasmanian marine shells. Papers and Proceedings of the Royal Society of Tasmania, 1878, 32–40

External links
  Tucker, J.K. 2004 Catalog of recent and fossil turrids (Mollusca: Gastropoda). Zootaxa 682:1–1295.
  Hedley, C. 1922. A revision of the Australian Turridae. Records of the Australian Museum 13(6): 213–359, pls 42-56 

delicatulus
Gastropods described in 1879
Gastropods of Australia